Les Cèdres is a municipality located north of the Saint Lawrence River in the Montérégie of Quebec, Canada, near Vaudreuil-Dorion. The population as of the Canada 2021 Census was 7,184.  The name means "The Cedars" in French.

There is an extensive rapid on the St. Lawrence River at this location. During the American Revolution, the Battle of the Cedars was fought in the vicinity. In 1959-1960 Swedish writer, Stig Claesson, lived in the village at a place called Point Charlie and later wrote a book about it called My friend Charlie.

History
This location was already notable in the late 17th century because of the large rapids on the St. Lawrence River, marked by tall cedars (French: les cèdres) that grew there in abundance. Hence, the location was originally known as Cedars Rapids, or as mentioned by cartographer Deshayes in 1695, as Rapide du  des Cèdres. Subsequently, it was also known as Coteau-des-Cèdres, Portage-du-Coteau-des-Cèdres, or just Les Cèdres. Numerous explorers and military expeditions passed there to portage around the rapids. It was first settled in 1715.

In 1845, the Parish Municipality of Saint-Joseph-de-Soulanges was created (named in honour of Joseph-Dominique-Emmanuel Le Moyne de Longueuil, Seigneur of Soulanges), followed by the Village Municipality of Soulange in 1852.

In 1967, the Village Municipality of Soulange was renamed to Les Cèdres. In 1985, Les Cèdres and Saint-Joseph-de-Soulanges were merged to form the current Municipality of Les Cèdres.

Demographics

Language

Local government
List of former mayors (since formation of current municipality):
 Joseph Adolphe Jean Paul Séguin (1985–1987)
 Joseph Osie Armand Levac (1987–1994)
 Lucien Daoust (1994–2002)
 Géraldine Tremblay Quesnel (2002–2013)
 Raymond Larouche (2013–2021)
 Bernard Daoust (2021–present)

Transportation
The west end of Quebec Autoroute 30, a Montreal Island bypass route, runs through this area to link up with Autoroute 20. Montréal/Les Cèdres Airport, a single-runway general aviation airport, is located north of Quebec Autoroute 20 in the Les Cèdres area.

Education
Commission Scolaire des Trois-Lacs operates Francophone schools.
 École Marguerite-Bourgeoys 
 Some areas are served by École Du Papillon-Bleu (pavillons Saint-Jean-Baptiste and Sainte-Trinité) in Vaudreuil-Dorion and by École Des Étriers in Saint-Lazare

Lester B. Pearson School Board operates Anglophone schools. It is zoned to Birchwood Elementary School and Evergreen Elementary School in Saint-Lazare and St. Patrick Elementary School in Pincourt.

See also
 List of municipalities in Quebec

References

External links

Municipalities in Quebec
Incorporated places in Vaudreuil-Soulanges Regional County Municipality
Quebec populated places on the Saint Lawrence River
Greater Montreal
Designated places in Quebec
Canada geography articles needing translation from French Wikipedia